Exodus Fall is a 2011 American drama road film directed by Ankush Kohli and Chad Waterhouse, and starring Rosanna Arquette, Jesse James, Devon Graye, Dee Wallace, and Christopher Atkins.

Plot
Set in 1974, the film centers on three siblings from Texas — Kenneth (Jesse James), Charlotte (Adrien Finkel), and Dana Minor (Devon Graye) — who are left living with their abusive, alcoholic mother Marilyn (Rosanna Arquette) after their father's death. Marilyn commits Dana, who is autistic, to an institution, allowing doctors to perform medical experiments on him. Kenneth and Charlotte break their younger brother out of the asylum, and the three siblings set out on a road trip, intending to travel from Texas to their grandmother's home in Oregon. They are joined by a hippie named Travis (Alexander Carroll).

Cast
Jesse James as Kenneth Minor
Rosanna Arquette as Marilyn Minor
Adrien Finkel as Charlotte Minor
Devon Graye as Dana Minor
Leo Rossi as Ford Ashworth
Alexander Carroll as Travis Crawford
Dee Wallace as Shirley Minor
Christopher Atkins as Wayne Minor
Duane Whitaker as Marty
Nina Kaczorowski as Lonnie

References

External links

2011 films
American drama road movies
Films about autism
Films about child abuse
Films set in 1974
2010s drama road movies
2011 drama films
2010s English-language films
2010s American films
Films about disability